Arvydas Novikovas (born 18 December 1990) is a Lithuanian professional footballer who plays as a winger for Israeli club Hapoel Haifa.

Club career

Lithuania
Novikovas started his professional football career in Lithuania, his hometown of Vilnius. He first played for the youth side of FK Vilnius and on loan to sister-club Interas-AE Visaginas. At the time in Lithuania, he impressed while on trial with Benfica, but did not sign for them.

Heart of Midlothian
In September 2008, Novikovas signed for Heart of Midlothian. He made his first team debut for Hearts in the last game of the 2008–09 Scottish Premier League season, a goalless draw against Celtic, coming on as a substitute in the 51st minute for David Templeton.

In the 2009–10 season, Novikovas earned a first team place, though spending most of the time on the bench, in most matches. Towards the end of the season, Novikovas signed a contract with the club, a three-year deal which would keep him in Edinburgh until 2013. 

Still very young, Novikovas suffered a serious injury and upon his return, he was sent to play some games for Hearts reserve and feeder team Tynecastle FC. There he was injured again after a horror tackle by Alasdair Kilgour, which delayed his return to the Hearts first team.
In the 2010–11 season, his playing time in the first team was still slender. Despite the first team lack of opportunities, he scored his first league goal for Hearts in the 5–0 win over Aberdeen at Tynecastle on 11 December 2010. Throughout the remainder of the 2010–11 season, he went on loan to Scottish Premier League's rivals St Johnstone.

In the 2011–12 season, on 13 August 2011, he struck his second goal for Hearts, again against Aberdeen, after starting the game up front alongside John Sutton, who scored the other two goals in a 3–0 victory for Hearts. A week after scoring his second goal, he made his European debut, playing the entire game in the second leg of the UEFA Europa League Qualification Round, a goalless draw against Tottenham Hotspur, which eliminated Hearts after a 5–0 loss in the first leg. He's been in and out of the first team ever since joining the club. In a 2–2 draw with Dundee United, Novikovas came off the bench to score an equaliser, his third goal for the club. After the match, Novikovas said his equaliser against Dundee United was the best he had ever scored.

In the 2012–13 season, Novikovas first team opportunities started to increase, following the departure of a bunch of players. He scored his fourth goal for the club in a 2–2 draw against Inverness Caledonian Thistle on 18 August 2012 and played both legs in the Europa League Qualification Round against Liverpool, which proved to be too strong for the Scottish side. Still the Edinburgh-based team pulled out a 1–1 draw in the second leg. In March 2013, Novikovas was then included in the substitute bench for the final of the Scottish League Cup against St Mirren and would come on for Jamie Walker on the 64th minute, as Hearts lost 3–2.

The official Hearts website announced that he had left the club to pursue his career elsewhere on 31 May 2013. After his departure, Edinburgh Evening News reported that if Novikovas joined a new club, the club would receive £100,000 compensation.

St Johnstone (loan)
On the last day of the January 2011 transfer window, Novikovas went on loan to St Johnstone until the end of the 2010–11 season. He made his debut for St Johnstone in their 2–0 victory over Hamilton on 1 February. In all he made six appearances for the Perth side.

Erzgebirge Aue
On 22 June 2013, it was announced that Novikovas signed a three-year deal with Erzgebirge Aue. It was thought that Novikovas was signed as Jan Hochscheidt replacement who has moved to Eintracht Braunschweig. During first league match for his new team Novikovas received two yellow cards and was sent off. In fourth league match for Aue he scored double, helping team to reach 2–1 victory over FC Energie Cottbus.

VfL Bochum 
On 24 July 2015, VfL Bochum announced that they signed Novikovas for free from FC Erzgebirge Aue on a two-year deal Novikovas played 20 games for VfL Bochum, providing only one assist on his stay there. On 12 January 2017, Vfl Bochum confirmed that Novikovas has left for Jagiellonia Białystok on a free.

Jagiellonia Białystok 
Novikovas joined Jagiellonia Białystok on a free, signing a contract until 31 December 2019. Novikovas was given the number 9 and was immediately a starter. During his two season there he has helped Jagiellonia Białystok finish second twice in a row. He scored 16 goals and provided 12 assists in the 58 games he has played for them, starting the 2018–19 season with three goals and two assists in his first nine games.

International career
Novikovas represented the Lithuania under-21's when he was just a 16-year-old.

In May 2009, he was called up to the Lithuania squad, for their FIFA World Cup qualifier with Romania. On 9 September, Novikovas scored for Lithuania under-21s 1–1 against Macedonia under-21 in the 2011 UEFA European Under-21 Football Championship qualification Group 9 match.

On 25 May 2010, he gained his first cap against Ukraine in Kharkiv.

Career statistics

Club

International

Scores and results list Lithuania's goal tally first, score column indicates score after each Novikovas goal.

References

External links
Player profile at heartsfc.co.uk

1990 births
Footballers from Vilnius
Lithuanian people of Russian descent
Living people
Lithuanian footballers
Lithuania under-21 international footballers
Lithuania international footballers
Association football wingers
Interas-AE Visaginas players
FC Vilnius players
Heart of Midlothian F.C. players
St Johnstone F.C. players
FC Erzgebirge Aue players
VfL Bochum players
Jagiellonia Białystok players
Legia Warsaw players
Büyükşehir Belediye Erzurumspor footballers
Samsunspor footballers
Hapoel Haifa F.C. players
A Lyga players
Scottish Premier League players
2. Bundesliga players
Ekstraklasa players
Süper Lig players
TFF First League players
Israeli Premier League players
Lithuanian expatriate footballers
Expatriate footballers in Scotland
Expatriate footballers in Germany
Expatriate footballers in Poland
Expatriate footballers in Turkey
Expatriate footballers in Israel
Lithuanian expatriate sportspeople in Scotland
Lithuanian expatriate sportspeople in Germany
Lithuanian expatriate sportspeople in Poland
Lithuanian expatriate sportspeople in Turkey
Lithuanian expatriate sportspeople in Israel